Ecuador–Mexico relations are the diplomatic relations between Ecuador and Mexico. Both nations are members of the Community of Latin American and Caribbean States, Latin American Integration Association, Organization of American States, Organization of Ibero-American States and the United Nations.

History

Axe-monies are evidence of economic and cultural exchange between the pre-Columbian cultures of western Mesoamerica and the northern Andes.

Ecuador (Viceroyalty of Peru and later the Viceroyalty of New Granada) and Mexico (New Spain) were both once part of the Spanish Empire. In 1819, Ecuador was part of the Gran Colombia (which included present day Colombia, Ecuador, Panama and Venezuela). After its break up, Mexico recognized and established diplomatic relations with Ecuador in June 1830. In 1837, Mexico opened a consulate in Guayaquil which subsequently became its first diplomatic mission in South America.

Diplomatic relations between the two nations began to significantly develop in the 1970s. In 1974, Mexican President Luis Echeverría paid a state visit to Ecuador and met with President Guillermo Rodríguez. The two leaders signed several agreements on economic, scientific and cultural cooperation. Since then, there have been numerous high level visits between leaders of both nations to each other's country.

For several years, Mexico has been returning Ecuadorian nationals without proper documentation on their way to the United States to Ecuador. Since 2006, drug traffickers and Central American gangs have increased their attacks on migrants transiting through Mexico. As a result, both Ecuador and Mexico have increased cooperation to provide better protection and consular support to hundreds of Ecuadorian migrants who traverse Mexico each year.

In December 2018, Ecuadoran President Lenín Moreno arrived to Mexico to attend the inauguration of Mexican President Andrés Manuel López Obrador. In August 2021, Ecuadorian President Guillermo Lasso paid a visit to Mexico and met with President López Obrador and Foreign Minister Marcelo Ebrard.

High-level visits
Presidential visits from Ecuador to Mexico

 President Carlos Alberto Arroyo del Río (1942)
 President Galo Plaza (1951)
 President León Febres Cordero (1985)
 President Rodrigo Borja Cevallos (1991)
 President Sixto Durán Ballén (1993)
 President Jamil Mahuad (1999)
 President Lucio Gutiérrez (2004)
 President Alfredo Palacio (2006)
 President Rafael Correa (2008, 2010, 2014)
 President Lenín Moreno (2018)
 President Guillermo Lasso (August & September 2021, 2022)

Presidential visits from Mexico to Ecuador

 President Luis Echeverría (1974)
 President Carlos Salinas de Gortari (1990)
 President Vicente Fox (2004)
 President Enrique Peña Nieto (2014, 2016)

Bilateral agreements
Both nations have signed several bilateral agreements such as a Treaty of Friendship, Commerce and Navigation; Cultural Exchange Agreement; Agreement of Cooperation to Combat Drug Trafficking and Drug Dependency; Agreement on 
Scientific and Technical Cooperation; Tourist Cooperation Agreement; Agreement to Avoid Double Taxation and Prevent Tax Evasion on Income subject to Tax; Agreement on Air Transportation; Agreement on Legal Assistance in Criminal Matters; Extradition Treaty and an Agreement on Mutual Recognition of Higher Education Studies issued by both nations.

Transportation
There are direct flights with Aeroméxico between Mexico City International Airport and Quito's Mariscal Sucre International Airport.

Trade relations
In 2018, two-way trade between both nations totaled US$850 million. Ecuador's main exports to Mexico include: cocoa, sardines, crude oil, jelly, coffee, asparagus and mangoes. Mexico's main exports to Ecuador include: shampoos, flat screens TVs, tractors, body deodorants and antiperspirants; and dentifrices. Mexico is the largest foreign investor in Ecuador. Between 2008 and 2017, Mexican companies invested US$1.4 billion in Ecuador. Mexican multinational companies such as América Móvil, Cemex, FEMSA, Grupo Bimbo, Mabe, Mexichem and OXXO (among others) operate in Ecuador.

Resident diplomatic missions
 Ecuador has an embassy in Mexico City and a consulate in Monterrey.
 Mexico has an embassy in Quito.

References

External links
Mexican Ministry of Foreign Affairs on bilateral relations between Mexico and Ecuador (in Spanish)

 
Mexico
Bilateral relations of Mexico